John William Guy (born 29 August 1934) is a former New Zealand cricketer who played 12 Tests for the national team between 1955 and 1961. He currently resides in Melbourne, Australia.

Life and career
Guy was born in Nelson on 29 August 1934, and was educated at Nelson College between 1950 and 1953.

Guy made his first-class cricket debut in 1953–54 for Central Districts. Moving around New Zealand in the course of his working career, he later represented Canterbury, Otago and Wellington, and finished his first-class career with Northern Districts in 1972–73. He is the only player to represent five New Zealand provincial teams in first-class cricket. He also played twice for Northamptonshire in the 1958 English cricket season.

Guy played his first Tests on the tour of Pakistan in 1955–56. In the series against India that followed immediately afterwards, he had his most successful series, scoring 313 runs at an average of 34.77, including a century (102) in the First Test, 52 in the Third Test, and 91 in the Fourth Test.

In the early 1960s Guy worked for Shell. Following the end of his cricket career, he became a national selector and was a representative for Newbury cricket bats. Guy developed the shoulderless Excalibur bat used by fellow New Zealand cricketer Lance Cairns.

References

External links
John Guy interview at New Zealand Cricket Museum

1934 births
Living people
New Zealand cricketers
New Zealand Test cricketers
Canterbury cricketers
Cricketers from Nelson, New Zealand
Central Districts cricketers
Northamptonshire cricketers
Northern Districts cricketers
Otago cricketers
Wellington cricketers
People educated at Nelson College
South Island cricketers
North Island cricketers